Zachary "Zack" Alford is a professional drummer, known for his work with the B-52's, Bruce Springsteen, David Bowie and Tomoyasu Hotei. Alford was brought in by Danny Kortchmar to drum on Billy Joel's River of Dreams album.

Alford contributed drum loops, acoustic drums, and electronic percussion on Bowie's 1997 albums Earthling and Earthling in the City and LiveAndWell.com (released online November 1999); as well as drums and percussion on Bowie's 2013 albums The Next Day and The Next Day Extra. Alford also performed live drums at 1,2,3 Soleils in France with Arabic artists  in 1998.

Alford performed live drums and percussion on three Bowie tours: Outside Tour (September 1995 – February 1996), Outside Summer Festivals Tour (June 1996 – July 1996), and Earthling Tour (June 1997 – November 1997).

In 2021, when their touring resumed, Alford joined the Psychedelic Furs.

References

External links

American drummers
Living people
Year of birth missing (living people)